Weakley may refer to:

People
Alan S. Weakley (born 1959), American botanist
Dwight Weakley (born 1969), Bahamian cricketer
Ian Weakley (born 1974), Jamaican hurdler
Robert Weakley (1764–1845), American politician from Tennessee

Locations
Weakley, Tennessee, an unincorporated community in Giles County
Weakley County, Tennessee

Newspaper
Weakley County Press, a newspaper in Martin, Tennessee.